Palaeaspilates is a genus of moths in the family Geometridae. The genus was described by Warren in 1894.

Species
Palaeaspilates carnea (Warren, 1914)
Palaeaspilates inoffensa Warren, 1894
Palaeaspilates reducta (Wiltshire, 1981)
Palaeaspilates sublutearia (Wiltshire, 1977)

References

External links

Rhodostrophiini